Mineo Higashi (born 1938) is an Okinawan writer. He was awarded the Akutagawa Prize in 1971 for his novel An Okinawan Boy (Okinawa no shonen, 1971). The novel's setting is from the city of Koza (later Okinawa City) in the 1950s, where the main character grows up in a family whose business is to arrange meetings between American soldiers and Okinawian girls in the family's apartment.

References

Akutagawa Prize winners
1938 births
Japanese writers
Living people
Writers from Okinawa Prefecture